District Courthouse, also known as Museo de Arte de Aguadilla, in Aguadilla, Puerto Rico, was built in 1925.  It was listed on the National Register of Historic Places in 1985.

It was designed by architect Rafael Carmoega.  The second story now serves as a museum of art.

References

Art museums and galleries in Puerto Rico
National Register of Historic Places in Aguadilla, Puerto Rico
Government buildings completed in 1925
Courthouses on the National Register of Historic Places in Puerto Rico
Neoclassical architecture in Puerto Rico
1925 establishments in Puerto Rico
Museums in Aguadilla, Puerto Rico